San Felipe-Del Rio Consolidated Independent School District (SFDR-CISD) is a school district based in Del Rio, Texas (USA).

The school district serves all of the city of Del Rio and some unincorporated portions of Val Verde County, including Cienegas Terrace, Lake View, and Val Verde Park, as well as  Laughlin Air Force Base. Dependent children who are residents of the base are zoned to SFDR-CISD schools.

In 2009 the superintendent took measures to crack down on students from Mexico who were illegally attending district schools. Prior to the crackdown many residents of Ciudad Acuña used false addresses to attend SFDR-CISD schools.

In 2009, the school district was rated "academically acceptable" by the Texas Education Agency.

Schools

Secondary schools

High schools
 Del Rio Freshman School (9)
 Del Rio High School (10-12)
 Early College High School (9-12)
 Blended Academy (8-12)

Middle schools
 Del Rio Middle School (7-8)
 San Felipe Memorial Middle School (6)

Primary schools
 Roberto Barrera STEM Elementary School (K-5) campus is inside Laughlin AFB 
 Buena Vista Elementary (K-5)
 Dr. Fermin Calderon Elementary (K-5)
 Irene C. Cardwell Elementary (Pre-K)
 Ruben Chavira Elementary School (K-5)
 Garfield Elementary (K-5)
 Dr. Lonnie Green Elementary (K-5)
 Lamar Elementary (K-5)
 North Heights Elementary (K-5)
 Ceniza Hills Elementary School (K-5) Opens-2023

See also 
 List of school districts in Texas

References

External links 
 San Felipe-Del Rio Consolidated Independent School District
 Articles in English and Spanish about the district - Del Rio News Herald
 "A Special Investigations Unit Report on the San Felipe-Del Rio Consolidated Independent School District" (Archive). State Auditor of Texas. Profile.

School districts in Val Verde County, Texas